Elz or ELZ may refer to:

Places
 Elz, a village in the market town of Lasberg, Upper Austria
 Elz, locality of Puch bei Weiz, Styria, Austria
 Elz, Hesse, a municipality in Hesse, Germany
 Elz, synonym for the Elzbach river, Rhineland-Palatinate, Germany
 Elz (Neckar), tributary of the Neckar river, Baden-Württemberg, Germany
 Elz (Rhine), tributaries of the Rhine River, Baden-Württemberg, Germany
 left arm of the Leopold Canal
 right arm Alte Elz and Kleine Elz at Kenzingen

People
 Kevin Robert Elz, computer programmer

Other uses
 ELZ, IATA airport code for Wellsville Municipal Airport

See also
 Elze (disambiguation)
 Eltz (disambiguation)